Sarah MacLean (born December 23, 1978) is a New York Times bestselling American author of young adult novels and romance novels.  Her first adult romance novel, Nine Rules to Break When Romancing a Rake debuted on the New York Times Bestseller List, where it stayed for four weeks. Since then, all of her adult romance novels have been on the New York Times and USA Today bestseller lists. From 2014 to 2018, MacLean wrote a monthly romance novel review column for The Washington Post. She is a two-time winner of the Romance Writers of America RITA Award for Best Historical Romance for A Rogue by Any Other Name in 2013 and No Good Duke Goes Unpunished in 2014. She's also the co-host of the weekly Fated Mates podcast, where she and her co-host, Jen Prokop, analyze and deconstruct the romance genre.

Biography
MacLean was born in Lincoln, Rhode Island to an Italian father and a British mother. MacLean's website reports that her mother worked for MI6. MacLean started reading romance because her older sister read the books, and she has wanted to be a romance novelist since she was a teenager. In 2000, MacLean received a BA in American Studies from Smith College in Northampton, Massachusetts. While at Smith, MacLean and her friends read hundreds of romance novels.

MacLean moved to New York City in 2000, and worked as a literary publicist until she attended graduate school at Harvard University, receiving a master's degree in education. Upon returning to New York City, she wrote her first book, a young adult novel, The Season, after a friend suggested she try her hand at writing for teens. The book, set in Regency England, received numerous awards, and was named to the 2010 Lone Star Reading List of the Texas Library Association.

After The Season, MacLean wrote her first adult romance novel, Nine Rules to Break When Romancing a Rake, a Regency historical. The book debuted on the USA Today Bestseller List and the New York Times Bestseller List, where it stayed for four weeks, and was the first recipient of the Romantic Times Magazine Seal of Excellence.

MacLean is a self-proclaimed feminist and speaks widely on the intersection of feminism and the romance genre. She is a vocal defender of the literary merit of the romance novel and the skill it takes to write it well. In February 2014, MacLean began writing a monthly romance review column for The Washington Post. In July 2019, she hosted the Romance Writers of America RITA Awards. In 2021, MacLean was also asked to guest appear on the popular podcast 99 Percent Invisible where she discussed the importance of the romance genre and its history (which co-aired on Fated Mates).

She and her husband live in Brooklyn, New York.  She is extremely active in social media, and often discusses her daily life on Twitter and Instagram.

Bibliography

Romance novels

Love By Numbers Series

The Rules of Scoundrels
 A Rogue By Any Other Name

Scandal and Scoundrel

Bareknuckle Bastards

Hell's Belles

 Bombshell. Avon. Aug 2021. ISBN 978-0063056152
 Heartbreaker. Avon. Aug 2022.

Romance Novellas
 "A Duke Worth Falling For" appeared in the anthology Naughty Brits (September 2020).
 "The Duke of Christmas Present" appeared in the anthology How the Dukes Stole Christmas (October 2018).  
 "She, Doomed Girl", co-written with Carrie Ryan,  appeared in the anthology Dark Duets (March 2013).

Young adult novels

Podcast
In 2018, MacLean started the Fated Mates podcast with critic Jen Prokop. The weekly podcast releases Wednesdays and features "deep dive discussions" of classic texts and books that showcase the sociological work of the romance genre, as well as "interstitial episodes" which provide long form analysis of common tropes used in the genre.

In its fourth season, Fated Mates is collecting the oral histories of romance trailblazers: authors, editors and others who built the modern genre.

Awards and reception
 2010 - Texas Library Association Lone Star Reading List for The Season
 2010 (April) - Romantic Times Magazine Seal of Excellence for Nine Rules to Break When Romancing a Rake
 2013 - Romance Writers of America, RITA Award for Best Historical Romance for A Rogue By Any Other Name
 2014 - Romance Writers of America, RITA Award for Best Historical Romance for No Good Duke Goes Unpunished

MacLean has hit the New York Times Bestseller List  and USA Today Bestseller List with all of her romance novels. She has received starred reviews for several titles from Booklist, Kirkus, Publishers Weekly, and Library Journal.

References

External links

21st-century American novelists
American women novelists
American writers of young adult literature
American romantic fiction writers
1978 births
Living people
21st-century American women writers
Smith College alumni
Harvard University alumni
Women romantic fiction writers
RITA Award winners
Women writers of young adult literature